David Arthur Stripp (born 4 April 1935) is a former English cricketer.  Stripp was a right-handed batsman who bowled right-arm fast-medium.  He was born at Crawley Down, Sussex.

Stripp made his first-class debut for Sussex against Essex in the 1956 County Championship.  He made eleven further first-class appearances for the county, the last of which came against Hampshire in the 1957 County Championship.  In his twelve first-class matches, he scored a total of 183 runs at an average of 10.76, with a high score of 32 not out.  With the ball, he took 6 wickets at a bowling average of 49.50, with best figures of 2/12.

References

External links
David Stripp at ESPNcricinfo
David Stripp at CricketArchive

1935 births
Living people
People from Crawley Down
English cricketers
Sussex cricketers